Central Green Co. v. United States, 531 U.S. 425 (2001), was a United States Supreme Court case decided in 2001. The case concerned the meaning of the words "flood or flood waters" within the Flood Control Act of 1928. The Court concluded that the law did not always apply to federal flood control facilities.

Background
Central Green Co. owned 1,000 acres of pistachio orchards in California's San Joaquin Valley. The Madera Canal flowed through their property. In 1996, they brought a suit against the United States alleging negligence in the operation and design of the canal. They alleged that it causes subsurface flooding which destroyed some of their crop. In court, the United States argued that the Flood Control Act of 1928 grants them immunity, as it states "[n]o liability of any kind shall attach to or rest upon the United States for any damage from or by floods or flood waters at any place". The District Court dismissed the complaint, agreeing with the United States that this incident would fall in the confines of "flood or flood waters". Central Green Co. appealed and the Ninth Circuit Court of Appeals affirmed. It agreed with Central Green that the Madera Canal "serves no flood control purpose", but nevertheless held that immunity attached "solely because it is a branch of the Central Valley Project". Central Green appealed again, this time to the United States Supreme Court, which granted review.

Opinion of the Court
Justice Stevens wrote the decision of the Court, which was unanimous. Stevens began by stating a prior case bound the Court to a different interpretation of the phrase "floods or flood waters" than the Ninth Circuit. In James v. United States (1986), the Court found the phrase "floods or flood waters" encompassed waters released for flood control purposes when reservoired waters are at flood stage. He went on to write that it was a difficult 'fact-led' question about whether this singular incident would fall within the James decision. For that reason, the Court would allow the suit to proceed in the District Court, only concluding that it was in error for the Government to receive absolute immunity in this case. Therefore, the Ninth Circuit was reversed.

See also
 Flood Control Act of 1928
 Legislative intent

References

External links

United States Supreme Court cases
United States Supreme Court cases of the Rehnquist Court
2001 in the environment
2001 in United States case law
United States environmental case law